Saint-Lubin-en-Vergonnois is a commune in the department of Loir-et-Cher, central France.

Population

See also
Communes of the Loir-et-Cher department

References

Communes of Loir-et-Cher